Goodwill is an unincorporated community in Washington County, Texas.  It is located on Farm to Market Road 1155, about 14 miles northeast of Brenham.

History 
Goodwill was founded after the 1900s.  A Baptist church and school was built there.  It is unknown when the school closed down, but as of 2000, the church remains.  There is no population estimate for Goodwill, nor is Goodwill on the Highway maps.

Education 
Any students in the area are in the Brenham Independent School District.

References

Unincorporated communities in Washington County, Texas